Gjirokastër District was one of the 36 districts of Albania, which were dissolved in July 2000 and replaced by 12 counties. It contained a large Greek ethnic minority. It is in the south of the country, and its capital was the city of Gjirokastër. Its territory is now part of Gjirokastër County: the municipalities of Gjirokastër, Dropull and Libohovë.

Administrative divisions
The district consisted of the following municipalities: 

Antigonë
Cepo
Dropull i Poshtëm
Dropull i Sipërm
Gjirokastër
Lazarat
Libohovë
Lunxhëri
Odrie
Picar
Pogon
Qendër Libohovë
Zagori

Villages of Gjirokastër

 Andon Poci
 Asim Zenel
 Bularat
 Cepos
 Derviçan
 Erind
 Frashtan
 Fushë-Bardhë
 Gerhot
 Golem (Gjirokastër)
 Goranxi
 Jergucat
 Kolonjë (Gjirokastër)1
 Kardhiq
 Krioner
 Lazarat
 Labova e Zhapes
 Labovë e Kryqit
 Libohova
 Mashkullorë
 Mingul
 Nivan
 Palokastër
 Picar
 Poliçan2
 Prongji
 Valare
 Vrisera
 Zhej
 Zhulat
 Pepeli

1 - not to be confused with Kolonjë District
2 - not to be confused with Poliçan of Skrapar District

Demographics

In fieldwork undertaken by Greek scholar Leonidas Kallivretakis in the area during 1992, the district of Gjirokastër had 66,000 inhabitants of which 40% were Greeks, 12% Vlachs and an Orthodox Albanian population of 21%. These communities are Orthodox and collectively made up 73% of the district's Christian population while the remaining 28% of the population were Muslim Albanians. Overall the Greek community was the most numerous ethno-religious group (40%), while Albanians, irrespective of religious background, in 1992 were a plurality and collectively consisted 49% of the district's total population. Within Gjirokastër district, Greeks populate all the settlements of both former municipalities of Dropull i Sipërm and Dropull i Poshtëm and also all settlements of Pogon municipality (except the village of Selckë). Gjirokastër has a mixed population consisting of Muslim Albanians, Greeks and an Orthodox Albanian population while the city in 1992 had an overall Albanian majority.

References

Districts of Albania
Geography of Gjirokastër County